may refer to either a governmental position during the  period, or the leader of a group of delinquents.

Governmental position 
In the  there are several references to people holding this position.

Juvenile delinquency 
In Japan in the 20th century, the term  refers to a leader of juvenile delinquents in middle and high schools. It is thought that this current meaning originates from the original meaning of the term—the personalities of guard commanders. Female  are called .

In reality, though,  were becoming increasingly rare in the 1970s, and by the 1980s the term was relatively old-fashioned. Vestiges of the word still remained, though, such as in the nicknames for baseball players Kazuhiro Kiyohara and Daisuke Miura. By the end of the 20th century, the term almost did not exist at all, though groups of delinquents who committed crimes began to stand out. The term became a title of honor for people with leadership personalities, and who stood against tough elements, and in turn, the negative connotation of the word diminished. It also became a scornful term for people who had a great deal of bravado.

Characteristics 
In some schools, students would hold secret elections to pick .

See also 
 Battle Royale II: Requiem
 Cromartie High School / Cromartie High – The Movie
 Crows Zero
 Juvenile delinquency
 Kenka Bancho: Badass Rumble
 Sanctuary (manga)
 
 Kongō Banchō
 Kunio-kun

References 

Japanese subcultures
Juvenile delinquency
Japanese words and phrases